Todd Jones (born August 15, 1967) is an American politician from Georgia. Jones is a Republican member of Georgia House of Representatives for District 25.

References

Republican Party members of the Georgia House of Representatives
21st-century American politicians
Living people
1967 births